Bad Säckingen station is a railway station in the town of Bad Säckingen, Baden-Württemberg, Germany. The station lies on the High Rhine Railway and the train services are operated by Deutsche Bahn. Passenger service over that line ended in 1971, and the line itself was abandoned in 1994.

Services 
 the following services stop at Bad Säckingen:

References

External links
 
 

Railway stations in Baden-Württemberg
Buildings and structures in Waldshut (district)